This list of veterans against the Iraq War are all military veterans from nations which compose the "Coalition of the Willing" who either:

A) Believe that the Iraq War was illegal, immoral, or unnecessary  from the beginning; or
 
B) Believe that the Iraq War is being waged incompetently or immorally, and have become publicly known as critics of the war.

Note: A number of retired generals and admirals called for Donald Rumsfeld's resignation. This may be grounds for them to be listed in category B.

A 
Daniel Akaka
Jack Anderson
John B. Anderson
Ed Asner

B 
Tom Bailey
John Batiste
Louis Beam
Milton Bearden
Harry Belafonte
Richard Belzer
Tony Bennett
Doug Bereuter
David Bonoir
Joseph Bruno
Harry Browne
William F. Buckley, Jr.
Dale Bumpers
George H. W. Bush

C 
Scott Camil
Vincent Cannistraro
Drew Carey
George Carlin
Chris Carney
Jimmy Carter
James Carville
Darrell Castle
Charles, Prince of Wales
Warren Christopher
Ward Churchill
Ramsey Clark
Wesley Clark
Max Cleland
William Sloane Coffin
Lawrence Colburn
Sean Connery
John Conyers
Marlow Cook
Selena Coppa
Irwin Corey
Roger Corman
William J. Crowe
Peter Cundall

D 
Ossie Davis
Aidan Delgado
Ron Dellums
John Dingell
Tammy Duckworth
John "Jimmy" Duncan, Jr.
Christopher Dodd
Kelly Dougherty, Director of the Iraq Veterans Against the War

E 
Clint Eastwood
John Eisenhower
Daniel Ellsberg

F 
Mike Farrell
Paul Findley
Larry Flynt
Gerald Ford
Morgan Freeman

G 
Tulsi Gabbard
James Garner
Jack Germond
Wayne Gilchrest
Stan Goff
Tim Goodrich, a founder of Iraq Veterans Against the War
Al Gore
Mike Gravel
Ben Griffin (former British soldier)
Alvin Greene
Bo Gritz
Robert Guillaume

H 
David Hackworth
Paul Hackett
Chuck Hagel
Tom Harkin
Paul Harvey
Hugh Hefner
Bob Herbert
Jeremy Hinzman
Joseph P. Hoar
Mike Hoffman, a founder of Iraq Veterans Against the War
Ernest Hollings
H. Allen Holmes
Andrew Horne
Henry Hyde

I 
Don Imus
Daniel Inouye

J 
Jim Jeffords
Walter B. Jones

K 
Casey Kasem
Ted Kennedy
John F. Kerry
Malcolm Kendall-Smith
Henry Kissinger
Ed Koch
Adam Kokesh
Lawrence Korb
Ron Kovic
August Kreis III
Kris Kristofferson
Karen Kwiatkowski

L 
Tony Lagouranis
Lyndon LaRouche
W. Patrick Lang
Frank Lautenberg
Isiah Leggett
Angelo Liteky

M 
Jesse Macbeth
Norman Mailer
Texe Marrs
Eric Massa
Charles Mathias
Pete McCloskey
Jim McDermott
George McGovern
Ray McGovern
Robert McNamara
Merrill McPeak
Camilo Mejia
Tom Metzger
Walter Mondale
Markos Moulitsas
Anthony Morris III
Diana Morrison, a founder of Iraq Veterans Against the War
Bill Moyer
Bobby Muller
Patrick Murphy
John Murtha

N 
Willie Nelson
Al Neuharth
Robert Novak
Sam Nunn

O 
William Eldridge Odom

P 
Isaiah Pallos, a founder of Iraq Veterans Against the War
Pablo Paredes
Thomas Pauken
Ron Paul
Tom Paxton
Edward Peck
Paul R. Pillar
Colin Powell
Larry Pressler
Psy

Q 
 Robin Quivers

R 
Charles B. Rangel
Jack Reed
Charley Reese
Carl Reiner
Randi Rhodes 
Paul Rieckhoff
Scott Ritter
Andy Rooney 
Wayne Rogers
Bobby Rush
Aaron Russo
Alex Ryabov, a founder of Iraq Veterans Against the War

S 
Norman Schwarzkopf, Jr.
Pete Seeger
Joe Sestak
Carl Sheeler
Eric Shinseki
Robert C. Smith
Ron Smith
Ronald I. Spiers
Thomas Sowell
Jerry Springer
Pete Stark
John Stockwell
Oliver Stone
Suzanne Swift

T 
Hunter S. Thompson
Mike Thompson
Russ Tice
Stansfield Turner
Ted Turner
Nick Tilton

U 
Peter Ustinov

V 
Jesse Ventura
Gore Vidal
James von Brunn
Kurt Vonnegut

W 
Shaun Walker
Ehren Watada
Dennis Weaver
James H. Webb
Lowell P. Weicker Jr.
Charles W. Whalen, Jr.
Cameron White
James Whitmore
Lawrence Wilkerson
Montel Williams
Brian Willson
Jeremiah Wright

Y 
James Yee

Z 
Howard Zinn
Anthony Zinni

See also 
Diplomats and Military Commanders for Change
About Face (formerly Iraq Veterans Against the War)
List of Iraq War Resisters
Families of the Fallen for Change